is a Japanese actress, voice actress and narrator who works for Aoni Production. She is married to Toei Animation producer Iriya Azuma. Her hometown is Fukuoka, Japan.

Biography

Filmography

Anime television series
Captain Tsubasa (1983) – Takeshi Sawada, Yuzo Morisaki
Sailor Moon (1992–95) – Petasos (15), Yasha (23), Queen Metaria, and Kaolinite
Kiteretsu Daihyakka (????) – Sayuri Kumada and Konchi
Saint Seiya (????) – young Ikki, and Makoto
One Piece (????) – Roji, Dadan, Luigia
Atashinchi (????) – Miss Hara

Video game series
Soul Calibur III (2005) – Aurelia Dichalla Dolce Dalkia, Old Woman

Dubbing
Viola Davis
Eat Pray Love – Delia Shiraz
Blackhat – FBI Special Agent Carol Barrett
Suicide Squad – Amanda Waller
Fences – Rose Lee Maxson
Widows – Veronica Rawlings
The Suicide Squad – Amanda Waller
Black Adam – Amanda Waller
2 Days in the Valley – Audrey Hopper (Marsha Mason)
Charmed (season 4 only) – Elise Rothman (Rebecca Balding)
Hairspray – "Motormouth" Maybelle Stubbs (Queen Latifah)

References

External links
 Official agency profile 
 
 

1963 births
Living people
Voice actresses from Fukuoka Prefecture
Voice actors from Fukuoka
Japanese video game actresses
Japanese voice actresses
20th-century Japanese actresses
21st-century Japanese actresses
Aoni Production voice actors